The Magnolia Award for Best Television Film (Chinese:白玉兰奖最佳电视电影) is the one of main categories of the Shanghai Television Festival.

Awards Winners & Nominations

External links
 13th Annual Winners
 14th Annual Winners
 15th Annual Winners
 16th Annual Winners

References

Shanghai Television Festival